Tin mining in Britain took place from prehistoric times, during Bronze Age Britain, until the 20th century. Mention of tin mining in Britain was made by many Classical writers. Tin is necessary to smelt bronze, an alloy that played a vital cultural role during the Bronze Age. As South-West Britain was one of the few parts of Anglian stage England to escape glaciation, tin ore was readily available on the surface. Originally it is likely that cassiterite alluvial deposits in the gravels of streams were exploited but later underground working took place.  Shallow cuttings were then used to extract ore. In the 19th century advances in mining engineering enabled the exploitation of much deeper mines. In a few cases these mines even extended both to multiple levels and workings below the seabed.

See also
Tin sources and trade in ancient times
Dartmoor tin-mining
Mining in Cornwall and Devon

References

External links

The history of the Count House of Ding Dong Mine, one of the oldest tin mines in Cornwall, where Richard Trevithick carried out his first experiments with high pressure steam.

Tin mining
Mining in the United Kingdom